The Congo River (Panama) is a river of Panama. The river spans over 2,900 miles (4,700 km), and is the second largest river, second to the Nile, on the continent.

See also
List of rivers of Panama

References

 Rand McNally, The New International Atlas, 1993.
CIA map, 1995.

Rivers of Panama